The 1978–79 Toronto Maple Leafs season was the 62nd season of the Toronto NHL franchise, 52nd as the Maple Leafs. The Leafs placed third in the Adams Division to make the playoffs where the Leafs won their first round series against the Atlanta Flames, only to lose in the second series to the Montreal Canadiens. Until 2021, this would mark the last time the Maple Leafs and Canadiens would play each other in the postseason.

Offseason

NHL Draft

Regular season

Final standings

Schedule and results

Player statistics

Regular season
Scoring

Goaltending

Playoffs
Scoring

Goaltending

Playoffs

Preliminary round
Toronto Maple Leafs vs. Atlanta Flames

Toronto wins best-of-three series 2 games to 0.

Quarter-finals
Toronto Maple Leafs vs. Montreal Canadiens

Montreal wins best-of-seven series 4 games to 0.

Transactions
The Maple Leafs have been involved in the following transactions during the 1978-79 season.

Trades

Waivers

Expansion Draft

Awards and records
Borje Salming, Second Team NHL All-Star, Defense

Farm Teams

References
 Maple Leafs on Hockey Database

Toronto Maple Leafs seasons
Toronto
Toronto